Uyanış, is the fourth studio album by Işın Karaca, released on 29 May 2009. She worked with sibel Alaş, Erdem Yörük, Erol Temizel and Zeki Güner. The album has a different sound compared to her previous albums, it also has R&B and electronic elements. She is the songwriter for several songs in the album.

Background

It is announced that she was working with Mirkelam, Dolapdere Big Gang and Hüsnü Şenlendirici. She was to perform 2 songs with a symphony orchestra. There would be a duet with Hüsnü Şenlendirici, one of the songs was arranged by Dolapdere Big Gang group, which is known for their ethnic musical style. Also famous Turkish pop singer Mirkelam gave a song for this album. But none of these could be prepared for the final release.

Initially, album name was chosen as "Aşkın Uyanışı", but later it was simplified to "Uyanış". The release date of 7 March 2008 was first postponed to autumn 2008 and then to 7 March 2009. The album was postponed for the third time after the original recordings were stolen with her laptop PC. Finally, the album was released on 29 May 2009 with SM Gold and Akış Production label.

First video for the album was decided for a slow song "Uyanış". It was delivered to radio stations on 24 April 2009. But then the first video was changed to an up-beat song "Bilmece", as the summer was coming. The video, shot in Indian style, was published on her website and delivered to TVs on 29 May 2009. The second video was shot for Uyanış by Sedat Doğan and Cem Başeskioğlu in January 2010. It was released to music channels on 5 February 2010.

Işın Karaca and Zeki Güner wrote 6 of the songs together. She also has two more collaborations. Işın Karaca and Erdem Yörük composed 6 songs together for this album.

Track listing

Personnel 
Arrangement: Erim Ardal (1), Erdem Yörük (2,4,6,8,10), Genco Arı (3), Hakan Yeşilkaya (5,7), Erol Temizel (9)
Producer: Bülent Seyhan
Executive producers: Işın Karaca & Akın Büyükkaraca
Musical directors: Işın Karaca & Akın Büyükkaraca & Erdem Yörük
Backing vocals: Işın Karaca, Uğur Akyürek, Yonca Karadağ, Murat Aziret

References

External links

Işın Karaca albums
2009 albums